Ctenuchidia virginalis is a moth of the subfamily Arctiinae. It was described by William Trowbridge Merrifield Forbes in 1930. It is found in Puerto Rico.

References

Arctiinae
Moths described in 1930